Roger Collins (born 1949) is an English medievalist, and honorary fellow in history at the University of Edinburgh.

Roger Collins may also refer to:
 Roger Collins (Dark Shadows), a fictional character from the Dark Shadows franchise
 Roger Collins (Sweet Valley High), a fictional character from the Sweet Valley High novel series

See also 
 Rodger Collins